The former New Zealand parliamentary electorate on the western inner city of Auckland, was known as City of Auckland West from 1861 to 1890, and then Auckland West from 1905 to 1946.

Population centres
From 1861 to 1884 the electorate comprised the suburbs of Ponsonby, Grey Lynn and Herne Bay.

In 1903 the Parliament passed the City Single Electorates Act, abolishing multi-member electorates from the end of the 15th Parliament in 1905.

The three inner-city Auckland electorates were recreated in 1905, with Auckland West first comprising the suburbs of Ponsonby, Herne Bay, Newton and parts of Grey Lynn; and from 1908 to 1946 covering Ponsonby and Herne Bay.

History
The City of Auckland West electorate was created for the election held on 11 January 1861 and it lasted to 1890. During this period, City of Auckland West was a two-member electorate.

At the first election in 1861, Josiah Firth and John Williamson were elected.

In the December 1875 election, Sir George Grey and Patrick Dignan were the only candidates in the two-member electorate and were thus declared elected. In January 1876, Grey also contested and won a seat in the Thames electorate. A protest against Grey's election was lodged with the returning officer the following day, stating that Grey had not been eligible to stand for election in Thames, as he had already been elected in Auckland West. This petition was filed to the House of Representatives at the end of January. On 8 July, the report of the committee inquiring into Sir George Grey's election for the Thames was read to the House. It was found that his election to the Thames electorate was in accordance with the law, but that he had to make a decision for which electorate he would sit. On 15 July 1876, Grey announced that he would represent Thames, and he moved that a by-election be held in Auckland West for the seat that he would vacate there.

The 25 July 1876 by-election caused by Grey's retirement was won by Benjamin Tonks, who resigned in 1877.

The electorate was then represented by James Wallis 1877–81, William John Hurst 1879–81 and David Goldie 1887–90.

The "Auckland West" electorate was created in 1905, and lasted to 1946. It was held for 1905–11 & 1914–19 by Charles Poole, 1911–14 by James Henry Bradney, and from 1919 until he died in 1940 by revered Labour prime minister Michael Joseph Savage. The next holder Peter Carr 1940–46 also died while holding the seat.

Members of Parliament
Key

multi-member electorate

From 1861 to 1881, City of Auckland West was a two-member electorate.

single member electorate

Election results

1943 election

1940 by-election

1938 election

1935 election

1931 election

1928 election

1925 election

1922 election

1919 election

1914 election

1911 election

1908 election

April 1875 by-election

1905 election

1879 by-election

1877 by-election

1876 by-election

April 1875 by-election

Notes

References

Historical electorates of New Zealand
1946 disestablishments in New Zealand
1890 disestablishments in New Zealand
1860 establishments in New Zealand
1905 establishments in New Zealand
Politics of the Auckland Region